The 1880 United States presidential election in Minnesota took place on November 2, 1880, as part of the 1880 United States presidential election. Voters chose five representatives, or electors to the Electoral College, who voted for president and vice president.

Minnesota voted for the Republican nominee, James A. Garfield, over the Democratic nominee, Winfield Scott Hancock. Garfield won the state by a margin of 26.92%.

With 62.28% of the popular vote, Minnesota would be Garfield's third strongest victory in terms of percentage in the popular vote after Vermont and Nebraska.

Results

See also
 United States presidential elections in Minnesota

References

Minnesota
1880
1880 Minnesota elections